Wallington, England may refer to:
 Wallington, Hampshire, a village in Hampshire, U.K.
 Wallington, Hertfordshire, a village in Hertfordshire, U.K.
 Wallington, London, a town in the London Borough of Sutton , U.K.
 Wallington, Surrey, an older name for Wallington, London, U.K.